15 Vulpeculae is a variable star in the northern constellation of Vulpecula, located approximately 243 light years away based on parallax. It has the variable star designation NT Vulpeculae; 15 Vulpeculae is the Flamsteed designation. It is visible to the naked eye as a faint, white-hued star with a typical apparent visual magnitude of 4.66. This object is moving closer to the Earth with a heliocentric radial velocity of −26 km/s.

This is an Am star with a stellar classification of A4 IIIm, matching an evolved A-type giant star. However, Gray & Garrison (1989) found a class of kA5hA7mA7 (IV–V), which matches a blend of subgiant and main sequence luminosity classes with the K-line (kA5) of an A5 star and the hydrogen (hA7) and metal (mA7) absorption lines of an A7 star. It is an Alpha2 Canum Venaticorum-type variable with magnitude ranging from 4.62 down to 4.67 over a period of 14 days. The star is radiating 60 times the Sun's luminosity from its photosphere at an effective temperature of 8,084 K.

References

A-type giants
Am stars
Alpha2 Canum Venaticorum variables
Vulpecula
Durchmusterung objects
Vulpeculae, 15
189849
098543
7653
Vulpeculae, NT